Rosalie is a former suburb of Brisbane, Queensland, Australia. Since 1975, it has been a neighbourhood within the suburb of Paddington.

History
The name Rosalie is probably derived from the Rosalie Plains pastoral station leased by John Frederick McDougall, who also owned land in the Milton and Rosalie areas of Brisbane.

On Saturday 7 November 1925, a new Baptist church was opened.

Rosalie was subject to flooding in the 1890 Brisbane floods.

The lower parts of Rosalie were inundated in the 2011 Brisbane Floods.

Amenities

The centre of Rosalie contains many local shops and restaurants. They are all located closely to the intersection of Baroona Road and Nash Street. Nearby parks and playgrounds include Gregory Park and Frew Park.

Rosalie Baptist Church is at 97 Fernberg Road.

Heritage listings

Rosalie has a number of heritage-listed sites, including:

 50 Elizabeth Street: Rosalie RSL Hall
 57 Elizabeth Street: Rosalie Community Kindergarten and Preschool
 Fernberg Road: Marist Brothers College Rosalie Buildings

References

External links
 
  — available online
 

 
Brisbane localities